Qomshaneh (also Romanized as Qomshāneh and Qomeshāneh; also known as Kumshāneh) is a village in Chaharduli Rural District, in the Central District of Asadabad County, Hamadan Province, Iran. At the 2006 census, its population was 98, in 24 families.

References 

Populated places in Asadabad County